The human ATP5F1C gene encodes the gamma subunit of an enzyme called mitochondrial ATP synthase.

This gene encodes a subunit of mitochondrial ATP synthase. Mitochondrial ATP synthase catalyzes adenosine triphosphate (ATP) synthesis, utilizing an electrochemical gradient of protons across the inner membrane during oxidative phosphorylation. ATP synthase is composed of two linked multi-subunit complexes: the soluble catalytic core, F1, and the membrane-spanning component, F0, comprising the proton channel. The catalytic portion of mitochondrial ATP synthase consists of 5 different subunits (alpha, beta, gamma, delta, and epsilon) assembled with a stoichiometry of 3 alpha, 3 beta, and a single representative of the other 3. The proton channel consists of three main subunits (a, b, c). This gene encodes the gamma subunit of the catalytic core. Alternatively spliced transcript variants encoding different isoforms have been identified. This gene also has a pseudogene on chromosome 14.

References

External links

Further reading